John Adrian Ene (born 1 January 1971) is a Romanian former football player and currently the goalkeeping coach of Liga I side Academica Clinceni. As a goalkeeper, Ene played in the top-flight for FC Brașov and in the second tier for Dunărea Giurgiu. After retirement, he worked as a goalkeeping coach or manager for teams such as Dunărea Giurgiu, Astra Ploiești or Academica Clinceni.

Honours

Dunărea Giurgiu
Divizia C: 2004–05

References

External links
 

1971 births
People from Ilfov County
Living people
Romanian footballers
Association football goalkeepers
Liga I players
Liga II players
FC Brașov (1936) players
Romanian football managers
LPS HD Clinceni managers
Association football goalkeeping coaches